This article contains the results of the Republic of Ireland women's national football team between 1990 and 1999. During the 1990s the Republic of Ireland competed in four UEFA Women's Championship qualification campaigns – 1991, 1993,  1997 and 2001. After losing 10–0 to Sweden in a Euro 1993 qualifier, the FAI did not enter a team in the 1995 competition. This defeat against Sweden remains the team's biggest defeat. They also competed in qualifiers for the 1999 FIFA Women's World Cup. On 4 September 1999 they also played an away friendly against the United States.

1990

1991

1992

1994

1995

1996

1997

1998

1999

Notes

References

1990s
1989–90 in Republic of Ireland association football
1990–91 in Republic of Ireland association football
1991–92 in Republic of Ireland association football
1992–93 in Republic of Ireland association football
1993–94 in Republic of Ireland association football
1994–95 in Republic of Ireland association football
1995–96 in Republic of Ireland association football
1996–97 in Republic of Ireland association football
1997–98 in Republic of Ireland association football
1998–99 in Republic of Ireland association football
1999–2000 in Republic of Ireland association football